HF Productions is a film production company that produces a global event series of film festivals and is based in Copenhagen, Denmark. Arctic Film Festival is one of the festivals organized by HF.

History and work 
Filmmaker Henrik Friis de Magalhães e Meneses founded the production company HF Productions in 2017 in Copenhagen, Denmark, with other offices in Jakarta, and New York City. He and the company's head of production Benn Wiebe have also executive produced documentaries including, Women of the Gulag, which was shortlisted for the 91st Academy Awards. HF is currently co-producing a documentary film, An Elephant in the Room along with director Katrine Philp and producer Katrine Sahlstrøm.

The company organizes a global event series of film festivals and currently runs 25 festivals around the world. In 2018, the company started an annual held film festival Rome Independent Cinema Festival to promote the independent cinema and filmmakers in Italy. In 2019, along with the partnership of the United Nations' Sustainable Development Goals (SDGs), HF organized Arctic Film Festival, the northernmost film festival in the world. Filmmakers from all around the world submitted their films and winners were given awards during the ceremony held in Longyearbyen, Svalbard, Norway.

Film festivals 
Film festivals established and organized by HF Productions are:
 Rome Independent Cinema Festival 
 Arctic Film Festival 
 Santorini Film Festival

Filmography 
 Women of the Gulag (2018)
 An Elephant in the Room (filming)

References

External links 
 

Film production companies of Denmark
Mass media companies based in Copenhagen
Non-theatrical film production companies
Documentary film production companies
Mass media companies established in 2017
Companies based in Copenhagen Municipality